Gurjar Aandolan is a 2014 Indian action film written and directed by Aarun Nagar and produced by Kirti Motion Pictures under his banner. It stars Aarun Nagar, Surendra Pal, Mushtaq Khan, Ehsan Khan, Leena Kapoor, Ali Khan, Rajendra Singh, Gurjar Bali and Ravi Verma. It was theatrically released on 17 October 2014.

Synopsis
The film centres on the Gurjar population. Since India's independence, the Gurjar community had been demanding reservation for itself. However, the government ignored the demands. After fifty years of peaceful protest, the Gurjars made Pradhan Ji their leader and took a more radical approach. The chief minister thought about giving reservation to the Gurjar community, but the other caste leader, Nagina Singh, threatened the chief minister with withdrawal of support from his party, burying the idea. For this reason the angry Gurjars burned train tracks under Ji's leadership, breaking the rail connection between the financial capital Mumbai and Delhi. As the news of this movement began to resonate in India as well as abroad, the state government used the police force to suppress this movement, killing 72. The Gurjar society continued to demand its reservation in a peaceful manner.

Cast
Aarun Nagar
Surendra Pal 
Mushtaq Khan 
 Ehsan Khan 
 Leena Kapoor 
 Ali Khan
 Ravi Verma
 Mahaveer Singh Fauji
 Kamal Verma
 Rajendra Singh Gurjar

Music

The film’s soundtrack was composed and produced by Aarun Nagar with lyrics by  Aarun Nagar, Khalil Jawed, Sanjit Nirmal, and Dhananjay. The first song, "Hum Gurjar Jite Hai Sean Se", was sung by Raja Hasan.

References

External links
 
 

2014 films
2010s Hindi-language films
Indian action films
Films set in 2013
2014 action films
Gurjar
Works about reservation in India